The , is a Japanese government Independent Administrative Institution which was created in 2004 when the former Japan National Oil Corporation merged with the former Metal Mining Agency of Japan.

History
JOGMEC integrates corollary functions in one administrative entity.  The former Japan National Oil Corporation (JNOC) had been tasked with securing a stable supply of oil and natural gas for Japan's use. The former Metal Mining Agency of Japan (MMAJ) had been tasked with ensuring a stable supply of nonferrous metal and mineral resources for Japan's use.  Greater efficiencies were realized by combining two bureaucracies with similar missions.  JOGMEC was established in 2004 pursuant to the 2002 Law Concerning the Japan Oil, Gas and Metals National Corporation.

In March 2013, JOGMEC becomes the first to successfully extract methane hydrate from seabed deposits.

Activities
JOGMEC's Geological Remote Satellite Sensing Centre in Lobatse, Botswana was created in partnership with the southern African nation's Department of Geological Survey in July 2008.  The Japan-Botswana partnership will work together in developing the exploration of minerals through methods such as remote sensing.

JOGMEC carried out the world's first "large-scale" deep sea mining of hydrothermal vent mineral deposits in August - September, 2017. This mining was carried out at the 'Izena hole/cauldron' vent field within the hydrothermally active back-arc basin known as the Okinawa Trough which contains 15 confirmed vent fields according to the InterRidge Vents Database.

JOGMEC manages rare metal stockpiles in conjunction with private companies.

See also
 Critical mineral raw materials
 Energy in Japan
 Energy law
 List of Independent Administrative Institutions (Japan)

Notes

References
 National Research Council (US). (2008).  Minerals, Critical Minerals, and the U.S. Economy. Washington, D.C.: National Academies Press. ;

External links
  JOGMEC website
 Technology and Research Center 
 Mineral Resources Information 

Energy in Japan
Independent Administrative Institutions of Japan